Vant may refer to:

Vant (band), British punk band
 Neil Vant, Canadian clergyman and politician
Turmite, a Turing machine in computer science
in India, the title for a high rank amongst the ennobled Hindu retainers of the Nizam of Hyderabad, equivalent to the Muslim nobiliary title Molk

See also
 Vantaa